"China Cat Sunflower" is a song performed by the Grateful Dead which was first recorded for their third studio album Aoxomoxoa. The lyrics were written by Robert Hunter and the music composed by Jerry Garcia.  The song was typically sung by Jerry Garcia.  The first live recording of this song appeared on Europe '72, paired (as was typical) with "I Know You Rider". Lyrically, this song has many literary references, including Lewis Carroll's Alice in Wonderland, George Herriman's Krazy Kat, and Dame Edith Sitwell's "Polka".

Live performances
The Grateful Dead first performed "China Cat Sunflower" on January 17, 1968, at the Carousel Ballroom in San Francisco, CA, and played the song well over 500 times in concert.  During the first year after its introduction into the band's set list, the song was played by itself or often in the middle of an extended jam between the songs "Dark Star" and "The Eleven"—a position more familiarly (to Deadheads) filled by "St. Stephen".  Four instances of this arrangement have been released on official recordings, the first on the compilation album So Many Roads (1965–1995), the second on Dick's Picks Volume 22, and the other two on Road Trips Volume 2 Number 2.

China Cat Sunflower → I Know You Rider

In late 1969 the Grateful Dead began segueing "China Cat Sunflower" into "I Know You Rider" during live performances.  Over the next 26 years they would pair these songs together over 500 times, most often as a second set opener. Only twice during this extended period was "China Cat Sunflower" played without this pairing.

Music and lyrical composition

The song begins with distinct guitar riffs. The first is played by Jerry Garcia and then a second one played by Bob Weir is interwoven on top of it. This second riff has been described by author Eric F. Wybenga as "that dodgy little Bobby intro that scratches your brain just behind the ears."

Wybenga described the lyrics as "acid-drenched", and said, further: "China Cat Sunflower's lyric—composed, Robert Hunter has said, in a state where contemplation of a cat served as touchstone for an interplanetary journey—is a real masterwork. It's one of the very few rock-and-roll lyrics (including Dylan's) that has as much impact on the page as it does sung, if not more. ... 'It's about acid' does it less justice than the observation that it's about seeing, sensing, and making connections in a sensuous world. Anyone out there remember what it was like to be three years old?"

In popular culture
The song is featured in the Rock Band video game series as downloadable content, along with 17 other Grateful Dead songs.

In the 2009 Ang Lee film Taking Woodstock, the version of the song from Europe '72 is used in the part of the film showing everyone arriving at Woodstock in 1969.

In 2020 entomologist J.H. Epler named a new species of diving beetle (family Dytiscidae) for the song; it is called Uvarus sinofelihelianthus. The specific epithet can be interpreted as (sino) China (feli) cat (helianthus) sunflower.

References

Grateful Dead songs
1969 songs
Songs written by Jerry Garcia
Songs with lyrics by Robert Hunter (lyricist)